Amerson is a surname. Notable people with the surname include:

Archie Amerson (born 1974), American and Canadian football player
Bill Amerson (1938–2015), American adult film producer and actor
David Amerson (born 1991), American football player
Glen Amerson (born 1938), American football player